Rolande Jeanne Risterucci (1911–1967), better known as Junie Astor, was a French actress.

Selected filmography
 Stradivarius (1935)
 The Lower Depths (1936)
 Women's Club (1936)
 Excursion Train (1936)
 27 Rue de la Paix (1936)
 La Garçonne (1936)
 Culprit (1937)
 Adrienne Lecouvreur (1938)
 Entente cordiale (1939)
 Latin Quarter (1939)
 The Carnival of Venice (1939)
 Beating Heart (1940)
 The Eleventh Hour Guest (1945)
 Secret Cargo (1947)
 Du Guesclin (1949)
 A Certain Mister (1950)
 The Beautiful Image (1951)
 Guilty? (1951)
 Service Entrance (1954)
 Mademoiselle Strip-tease (1957)
 Isabelle Is Afraid of Men (1957)
 Interpol Against X (1960)
 Business (1960)
 The Man from Interpol (1966)

Bibliography
 Crisp, C.G. The classic French cinema, 1930-1960. Indiana University Press, 1993 
 Durgnat, Raymond. Jean Renoir. University of California Press, 1974.

External links

1911 births
1967 deaths
French film actresses
Actresses from Marseille
20th-century French actresses
Road incident deaths in France